Ferran Martin from the Autonomous University of Barcelona (UAB), Bellaterra, Barcelona, Spain was named Fellow of the Institute of Electrical and Electronics Engineers (IEEE) in 2012 for contributions to metamaterial-based transmission lines for microwave applications.

References

Fellow Members of the IEEE
Living people
Year of birth missing (living people)
Place of birth missing (living people)
Academic staff of the Autonomous University of Barcelona